Ward 7 is a municipal ward in the east end of Windsor, Ontario, Canada. Its representation on Windsor City Council is currently Angelo Marignani. It contains that part of the city of Windsor east of the Little River and north of the E. C. Row Expressway. It covers the neighbourhoods of Forest Glade and East Riverside.

Ward 7 was created for the 2010 municipal elections when Windsor City council went from having five wards (two councillors each) to 10 (one councillor each). Previously most of the area had been part of Ward 5, with a small part belonging to Ward 4.

Election results

2010

2013 by-election
A by-election was held on December 9, 2013 to replace Hatfield who had been elected as an MPP for Windsor—Tecumseh.

2014

2018

2020 by-election
A by-election was held on October 5, 2020 to replace Kusmierczyk who was elected as the MP for Windsor—Tecumseh. The by-election was originally scheduled for April 27, but was postponed due to the COVID-19 pandemic in Ontario.

Candidates  
Igor Dzaic - part-time administrator and economics student at the University of Windsor. Campaigned on his connections to the Progressive Conservative Party of Ontario. Has come under fire for past "misogynistic, homophobic (and) transphobic" statements made on social media. Ran for the Catholic school board in 2014. 
Farah El-Hajj - constituency assistant for Windsor West New Democratic Party MP Brian Masse and Windsor West Ontario New Democratic Party MPP Lisa Gretzky.
Michelle Gajewski - customs broker
Jeewen Gill - real estate broker Ran for the Liberal Party of Canada nomination in Windsor—Tecumseh for the 2019 federal election.
Barb Holland - business owner (The Holland Benefits Group); former Windsor-Essex Catholic District School Board trustee (2000-2018); ran in this ward in 2018. 
Ernie Lamont - salesman 
Greg Lemay - business owner (Alpha Pro Floor Care & Machine Repair) 
Michael Malott - Chrysler Canada employee; labour activist. 
Angelo Marignani - Works for Magna International,  Materials Department. Has run in this ward in every election and by-election since its creation. 
Thérèse Papineau - Care worker; retired public servant (Toronto Police Service). 
Albert Saba - Employment Counsellor, Job Developer, College Professor & Community Organizer; Ran in this ward in 2018. 
Howard Weeks - Retired Son of former mayor Bert Weeks.

Results

2022

References

Municipal government of Windsor, Ontario
Municipal electoral districts of Canada